Tomás Carbonell and Martín García were the defending champions but only Carbonell competed that year with Daniel Orsanic.

Carbonell and Orsanic won in the final 6–2, 2–6, 6–2 against Enzo Artoni and Emilio Benfele Álvarez.

Seeds
Champion seeds are indicated in bold text while text in italics indicates the round in which those seeds were eliminated.

 Tomás Carbonell /  Daniel Orsanic (champions)
 Pablo Albano /  Marc-Kevin Goellner (quarterfinals)
 Juan Balcells /  Albert Portas (quarterfinals)
 Mariano Hood /  Sebastián Prieto (semifinals)

Draw

External links
 2001 Campionati Internazionali di Sicilia Doubles draw

Campionati Internazionali di Sicilia
2001 ATP Tour
Camp